Buckingham Hundred was a hundred in the ceremonial county of Buckinghamshire, England. It was situated in the north west of the county and forming the boundary with the counties of Oxfordshire and Northamptonshire. There was also a small detached portion of the hundred embedded in Oxfordshire close to Bicester.

History
Until at least the time of the Domesday Survey in 1086 there were 18 hundreds in Buckinghamshire. It has been suggested however that neighbouring hundreds had already become more closely associated in the 11th century and around 1316 the original or ancient hundreds had been consolidated into 8 larger hundreds. Buckingham became the name of the hundred formed from the combined 11th century hundreds of Lamva (after Lamua Hill in Steeple Claydon), Rovelai (after the Rowley Hills in Lenborough) and Stodfald (after Stowe) although these original names still persisted in official records until at least the early part of the 17th century. The court leet for Buckingham hundred was every three weeks at various localities across the hundred.

Parishes and hamlets 
Buckingham hundred comprised the following ancient parishes and hamlets, (formerly medieval vills), allocated to their respective 11th century hundred:

 
 

† Thornton was later transferred to the hundred of Lamua.

* Caversfield was a detached parish located within Oxfordshire and was transferred to that county in the 19th century

‡ Buckingham was part of Rovelai hundred for administrative purposes even though by the 11th century it had become a substantial settlement and the town and was granted Borough status in the 16th century. Bourton, Gawcott and Lenborough were part of the parish of Buckingham.

See also
 List of hundreds of England and Wales

References

Hundreds of Buckinghamshire